Peter Ambrose Hearne FREng (14 November 1927 - 24 January 2014) was a British engineer, who developed a lot of the technology for head-up displays (HUD). He was Chairman of GEC Avionics.

Early life
He was born in Sunderland.

He attended the Loughborough College of Technology (now Loughborough University) where he studied Aeronautical Engineering, and Cranfield Institute of Technology (now Cranfield University) from 1947.

Career
He joined BOAC in 1949 and BEA in 1954, where he worked as an aerodynamicist.

GEC Avionics
He became deputy general manager of Marconi Avionics in 1960. He became general manager in 1966.

Personal life
He married in April 1952 and had three sons; his wife was the secretary of the technical director of BOAC. He lived at Wateringbury. He enjoyed gliding. He died in 2014.

References

External links
 Telegraph obituary March 2014
 GEC Avionics News

1927 births
2014 deaths
Aerodynamicists
Alumni of Cranfield University
Alumni of Loughborough University
British European Airways
Fellows of the Royal Academy of Engineering
General Electric Company
People from Sunderland
Engineers from Tyne and Wear
People of the British Overseas Airways Corporation
People from Wateringbury